"Shooting Star" is a song by American rock band Poison. It is the third and final single released from Poison's 7th studio album Hollyweird, which debuted at #103 on the Billboard 200 and #8 on the Top Independent Albums chart. The song was released as a single in November 2002.

Fallen Angel 2
The song has been referred to as Part 2 to the band's 1988 hit single "Fallen Angel".

The lyrics were written by Bret Michaels and C.C. DeVille. The B-side to the single is "Wasteland".

Albums
"Shooting Star" is on the following albums.

 Hollyweird
 The Best Of Poison: 20 Years Of Rock

Personnel
Credits adapted from liner notes of Hollyweird.
 Bret Michaels - lead vocals, rhythm guitar, keyboards
 C.C. DeVille - lead guitar, backing vocals
 Bobby Dall - bass guitar, backing vocals
 Rikki Rockett - drums, backing vocals

References

2003 singles
2002 songs
Poison (American band) songs